Ole Martin Høystad (born 1947) is a Norwegian convicted Soviet spy who became known for his role in the , where he worked as a guard. He was arrested in 1972 and convicted of treason and espionage by Eidsivating Court of Appeal the following year. The Høystad case received significant media coverage in the 1970s and was one of three major espionage cases in Norway in the last two decades of the Cold War, preceding the Haavik case and the Treholt case. The verdict said Høystad had "grossly violated the duties and loyalty he owed his country, with consequences that in a given situation could have been catastrophic." While serving his 7-year sentence, he graduated in literature, and upon release from prison he became a lecturer at Telemark University College (now the University of South-Eastern Norway), where he later was promoted to professor in cultural studies.

References 

1947 births
Living people
20th-century Norwegian criminals
Norwegian male criminals
Norwegian people convicted of spying for the Soviet Union
Prisoners and detainees of Norway
Norwegian prisoners and detainees
1973 in politics